The Parque Reparto Metropolitano is a 1,000-seat association football stadium in San Juan, Puerto Rico. As of the 2018-19 Liga Puerto Rico season, it hosts the home matches of Metropolitan FA. It is also home to the administrative offices of the club.

References

External links
Soccerway profile

Football venues in Puerto Rico